High Street Blues was a short-lived British television sitcom series produced by LWT for ITV from 6 January to 10 February 1989. It ran for six episodes, each 30 minutes long. The series starring Phil McCall, Ron Pember, Elizabeth Stewart, Georgia Mitchell, Valerie Walsh, Chris Pitt, Victoria Hasted, Martin Turner, Johnny Shannon, Eve Bland and Shirley Dixon.

Cast
 Phil McCall as Charlie McFee
 Ron Pember as Chesney Black
 Elizabeth Stewart as Mavis Drinkwater
 Georgia Mitchell as Paula Franks
 Valerie Walsh as Ritta Franks
 Chris Pitt as Bob Farthing
 Victoria Hasted as Susan Drinkwater
 Martin Turner as Valentine
 Johnny Shannon as Sharpe
 Eve Bland as Sheila
 Shirley Dixon as managing director

References

External links
 

1989 British television series debuts
1989 British television series endings
1980s British sitcoms
ITV sitcoms
London Weekend Television shows
English-language television shows
Television series by ITV Studios
Television shows set in Surrey